New Found Power is the only studio album released by heavy metal supergroup Damageplan. The group was formed by brothers "Dimebag Darrell" Abbott (guitar) and "Vinnie Paul" Abbott (drums) after the breakup of their previous band, Pantera.

"New Found Power" was also the original name of the band but was changed prior to the album's release. The record sold 44,676 copies in its first week to debut at number 38 on the Billboard 200.

Overview 
The album was recorded at the Abbott brothers' backyard studio, Chasin' Jason in Arlington, Texas, where previous Pantera albums had been recorded. It also features guest appearances from vocalist Corey Taylor and guitarists Jerry Cantrell and Zakk Wylde, who had previously made live guest appearances with Pantera, as well as being close friends with all band members.

The single "Save Me" debuted on American radio on January 26, 2004. "Breathing New Life" served as the album's music video debut and aired frequently on both Headbangers Ball and Uranium in early 2004. This was followed by videos for "Save Me" and "Explode".

Many of the lyrical themes on New Found Power seem to deal with the breakup of Pantera, of which "Dimebag" Darrell Abbott and drummer Vinnie Paul Abbott were founding members along with Rex Brown.

New Found Power is guitarist Dimebag Darrell's last studio appearance prior to his murder in December 2004. Following the death of Darrell Abbott during a Damageplan concert, there has been speculation about a follow up to the album. In 2006 when Vinnie Paul was asked about the follow up in an interview, he replied "it will happen when the time is right. I want to stay focused where I am now." At the time, he was busy promoting his new band Hellyeah and their self-titled debut album. He also mentioned "I think the fans would want to hear it, so yes I'd say within 10 years."

Critical reception 

New Found Power received mixed reviews from music critics; Christine Klunk of PopMatters commented "I'm not in the least bit interested in where this band goes or what new and exciting ways they'll think of to abuse the listeners." However, Allmusic's Johnny Loftus considered the album a "blazing new beginning".

Track listing

Personnel 
Credits adapted from liner notes, except where noted.
Damageplan
 Patrick Lachman − vocals
 Dimebag Darrell − guitars
 Bob Zilla − bass
 Vinnie Paul − drums

Guest musicians
 Corey Taylor − second verse, breakdown, and last chorus on "Fuck You"
 Zakk Wylde − second guitar solo on "Reborn" and answer vocals on "Soul Bleed"
 Jerry Cantrell − vocals on "Ashes to Ashes" 

Production
 Vinnie Paul, Dimebag Darrell − production
 Sterling Winfield, Patrick Lachman − co-production
Howie Weinberg, Roger Lian − mastering (at Masterdisk studios, New York)
 Johnny Marshall − string arrangement on "Soul Bleed"
 Sterling Winfield − mixing of "Soul Bleed"
 Rae Nimeh − additional sequencing and production on "Pride"
 All other arrangements recorded and mixed at Chasin' Jason Studios, Texas

Charts

References 

2004 albums
Damageplan albums
Elektra Records albums